Werner Hochbaum (7 March 1899, Kiel – 15 April 1946) was a German screenwriter, film producer and director.

Selected filmography
 Brothers (1929)
 Raid in St. Pauli (1932)
 Tugboat M 17 (1933)
 Judgment of Lake Balaton (Hungary/Austria, 1933)
 Life Begins Tomorrow (1933)
 Suburban Cabaret (Austria, 1935)
 The Eternal Mask (Austria/Switzerland, 1935)
 Light Cavalry (German) (1935), Light Cavalry (French) (1935)
 Schatten der Vergangenheit (Austria, 1936)
 Hannerl and Her Lovers (Austria, 1936)
 The Empress's Favourite (1936)
 Talking About Jacqueline (1937)
 A Girl Goes Ashore (1938)
 Drei Unteroffiziere (1939)

Bibliography
 Bergfelder, Tim & Bock, Hans-Michael. The Concise Cinegraph: Encyclopedia of German Cinema. Berghahn Books, 2009.
 Kreimeier, Klaus. The Ufa story: a history of Germany's greatest film company, 1918-1945''. University of California Press, 1999.

External links

1899 births
1946 deaths
Film people from Schleswig-Holstein
Nazi Party members
Mass media people from Kiel